Commercial Space Launch Act of 1984 is a United States federal law authored to facilitate the private enterprise of the commercialization of space and space technology. The Act of Congress set forth the quest to acquire innovative equipment and services offered by entrepreneurial ventures from the information technology services, remote sensing technology, and telecommunications industries. The Act recognized the United States private sector as having the capability to develop commercial launch vehicles, orbital satellites, and operate private launch sites and services. The Act also assigned the duties of overseeing and coordinating commercial launches, issuing of licenses and permits, and promotion of safety standards to the Secretary of Department of Transportation.

The H.R. 3942 legislation was enacted by the 98th Congressional session and signed by President Ronald Reagan on October 30, 1984.

History
In the 1970s, the National Aeronautics and Space Administration began to look for ways to outsource the use of its launching facilities and services to private companies such as COMSAT, RCA, and Western Union. This search was due to the fact that maintaining, modifying, launching, and other duties required to launch expendable launch vehicles cost upwards of billions of dollars. Once the space shuttle became operational, NASA and the United States Air Force began using it almost exclusively. In order to accommodate the heavy weight of the space shuttle launch system, the USAF spent billions of dollars modifying one launch pad in Vandenberg Air Force Base. However, it was never used.

Provisions of the Act
Title 51 United States Code Subtitle V and Chapter 509 was compiled as twenty-three code of law sections to vitalize commercial opportunities and space launch services for the civilian space program of the United States.

51 U.S.C. § 50901 - Findings and purposes 
51 U.S.C. § 50902 - Definitions 
51 U.S.C. § 50903 - General authority
51 U.S.C. § 50904 - Restrictions on launches, operations, and reentries
51 U.S.C. § 50905 - License applications and requirements
51 U.S.C. § 50906 - Experimental permits 
51 U.S.C. § 50907 - Monitoring activities
51 U.S.C. § 50908 - Effective periods, and modifications, suspensions, and revocations, of licenses 
51 U.S.C. § 50909 - Prohibition, suspension, and end of launches, operation of launch sites and reentry sites, and reentries
51 U.S.C. § 50910 - Preemption of scheduled launches or reentries
51 U.S.C. § 50911 - Space advertising 
51 U.S.C. § 50912 - Administrative hearings and judicial review
51 U.S.C. § 50913 - Acquiring United States Government property and services 
51 U.S.C. § 50914 - Liability insurance and financial responsibility requirements
51 U.S.C. § 50915 - Paying claims exceeding liability insurance and financial responsibility requirements
51 U.S.C. § 50916 - Disclosing information
51 U.S.C. § 50917 - Enforcement and penalty
51 U.S.C. § 50918 - Consultation
51 U.S.C. § 50919 - Relationship to other executive agencies, laws, and international obligations
51 U.S.C. § 50920 - User fees
51 U.S.C. § 50921 - Office of Commercial Space Transportation
51 U.S.C. § 50922 - Regulations
51 U.S.C. § 50923 - Report to Congress

Amendments to 1984 Act
Chronological amendments to the Commercial Space Launch Act of 1984.

See also

References

External links
 

1984 in law
98th United States Congress
commercial spaceflight
presidency of Ronald Reagan
private spaceflight
1984
United States federal legislation